Markaziy Stadium is a multi-use stadium in Namangan, Uzbekistan. It is currently used mostly for football matches. The stadium holds 22,000 people. It is the home stadium of PFC Navbahor Namangan.

Football venues in Uzbekistan
Sport in Namangan
Navbahor Namangan